George Arthur Hansen Renwick (12 May 1886 – 11 March 1945) was an Australian rules footballer who played with Carlton in the Victorian Football League (VFL).

Notes

External links 
		
George Renwick's profile at Blueseum

1886 births
1945 deaths
VFL/AFL players born in England
Australian rules footballers from Western Australia
Carlton Football Club players
West Perth Football Club players
Boulder City Football Club players
People from Tooting
English emigrants to Australia
Sportspeople from London